The Real Janelle is an EP by Bratmobile, released in 1994. It would become Bratmobile's last studio recording in six years. Though released before The Peel Session, that was recorded a year prior.

The title "The Real Janelle" was inspired by a Born Against song written by Ben Weasel of Screeching Weasel. The Born Against song and The Real Janelle reference Janelle Hessig, a former Bratmobile roadie and East Bay fanzine creator known for producing "Tales of Blarg" and "Desperate Times." The photo on the cover of the EP is of Hessig.

Track listing
"The Real Janelle" – 1:41
"Brat Girl" – 1:58
"Yeah, Huh?" – 2:00
"Die" – 1:48
"And I Live in a Town Where the Boys Amputate Their Hearts" – 2:41
"Where Eagles Dare" (The Misfits cover) – 2:04

Album credits
Bratmobile
Allison Wolfe – Singer/Songwriter
Erin Smith – Guitar
Molly Neuman – Drums

Recorded July 1993 at Avast, Seattle, Washington. Engineered by Stuart Hallerman. Mixed by Stuart Hallerman, Slim Moon, and Bratmobile. Prints by Tinúviel.

References

1994 albums
Bratmobile albums
Kill Rock Stars albums